Truong Hai Auto Corporation (THACO),, is an automobile manufacturer in Vietnam. THACO is a member of Vietnam Automobile Manufacturers Association (VAMA). The company was founded in 1997 and is considered one of the pioneers of the Vietnamese auto industry. In 2014 the company captured 32% of Vietnam's automobile market. As of 2017, THACO owned the largest automobile production capacity in Vietnam, at 71,000 units per year.

THACO main products comprises family cars, light trucks and buses. The company has a joint venture with Kia Motors to produce Kia branded cars from its main factory located in Chu Lai Economic Zone. It also produces and manufactures Mazda passenger cars through its VinaMazda subsidiary. In 2020, the company entered the light motorcycle market.

In 2021, THACO acquired the Vietnamese retail operations of e-mart.

Models

Mazda models (2, 3, 6, CX-5, CX-8, CX-30)
Kia Motors models (Morning, Soluto, Rondo, K3, Sorento, K5, Carnival, Seltos, Sonet) 
Peugeot models (2008, 3008, 5008, Traveller)
Thaco buses built on Hyundai chassis (Thaco City, Thaco County, Thaco Town, Thaco Universe, Thaco Mobihome)
Hyundai buses (Hyundai Solati, Hyundai County)
Hyundai trucks
Foton trucks
Thaco trucks and light commercial vehicles (Thaco Towner, Thaco Frontier, Thaco Forland, Thaco Ollin)  
Mercedes-Benz buses assembly for Vietnamese market
BMW models (1 Series, 2 Series, 3 Series, 4 Series, 5 Series, 7 Series, X Series)
Mini models (Cooper)
Fuso truck (Canter, FA, FI, FJ)
Iveco minibus (Iveco Daily)
Howo trucks (TX D600, TX D800)
Volvo buses (B8R)

References

External links 
 THACO

Car manufacturers of Vietnam
Manufacturing companies based in Ho Chi Minh City 
Vehicle manufacturing companies established in 1997
Vietnamese brands
Truck manufacturers of Vietnam
Vietnamese companies established in 1997